Riffler may refer to:

Riffle splitter, a sampling device used for dividing particulate
Riffler file, a file that can be used in hard to reach areas